Bjørvik Jacobsen (16 July 1916 – 15 October 2000) was a Norwegian trapper/hunter and author. He was the son of Wanny Woldstad.

He wintered at Harmon (Halvmåneøya) in 1947.
He brought the polar bear cub "" back to Tromsø.

He had a teacher's education, and settled in Nordreisa. He wrote two books and a series of articles about life as a trapper based on his experiences.

In his later years he lived and married in Gryllefjord on Senja in Troms.

Bibliography
 Halvmåneøya: en fangstberetning fra Svalbard - Oslo, Tiden, 1983. 
 : M/S «Enigheten»s tragiske forlis - Oslo, Gyldendal 1986.

References 

1916 births
2000 deaths
Norwegian writers
20th-century Norwegian writers